Golden Triangle is an unincorporated community and census-designated place (CDP) located within Cherry Hill Township, in Camden County, New Jersey, United States. As of the 2010 United States Census, the CDP's population was 4,145.

Golden Triangle is roughly bordered by Chapel Avenue, Cuthbert Boulevard, Cooper Landing Road, and Route 70/Marlton Pike.

Geography
According to the United States Census Bureau, the CDP had a total area of 2.949 square miles (7.637 km2), including 2.837 square miles (7.347 km2) of land and 0.112 square miles (0.290 km2) of water (3.79%).

Demographics

Census 2010

Census 2000
As of the 2000 United States Census there were 3,511 people, 1,358 households, and 862 families living in the CDP. The population density was 474.0/km2 (1,225.8/mi2). There were 1,457 housing units at an average density of 196.7/km2 (508.7/mi2). The racial makeup of the CDP was 80.75% White, 9.40% African American, 0.14% Native American, 5.16% Asian, 2.08% from other races, and 2.48% from two or more races. Hispanic or Latino of any race were 5.50% of the population.

There were 1,358 households, out of which 24.0% had children under the age of 18 living with them, 47.2% were married couples living together, 11.5% had a female householder with no husband present, and 36.5% were non-families. 30.8% of all households were made up of individuals, and 12.7% had someone living alone who was 65 years of age or older. The average household size was 2.43 and the average family size was 3.09.

In the CDP the population was spread out, with 19.3% under the age of 18, 6.4% from 18 to 24, 31.2% from 25 to 44, 22.4% from 45 to 64, and 20.8% who were 65 years of age or older. The median age was 41 years. For every 100 females there were 96.3 males. For every 100 females age 18 and over, there were 92.2 males.

The median income for a household in the CDP was $46,266, and the median income for a family was $57,583. Males had a median income of $34,726 versus $31,563 for females. The per capita income for the CDP was $22,423. About 4.6% of families and 7.7% of the population were below the poverty line, including 6.6% of those under age 18 and 5.7% of those age 65 or over.

References

Census-designated places in Camden County, New Jersey
Neighborhoods in Cherry Hill, New Jersey